The 1970 12 Hours of Sebring was an endurance race held at the 5.2 mile (8.3 km) Sebring International Raceway, Sebring, Florida, United States on March 21, 1970. It was the twentieth running of the endurance classic and the second round of the 1970 World Sportscar Championship season.

Pre-race
John Wyer's Gulf-Porsche team had just come fresh off a 1-2 victory at Daytona 7 weeks earlier. So far, Porsche was ahead in the championship against their only real rival, Ferrari. When the teams descended upon the isolated and very bumpy 5.2 mile Sebring airfield circuit in central Florida, qualifying was a mix of Ferraris and Porsches: American Mario Andretti qualified the #19 works Ferrari 512S Spyder on pole position at 121 mph at 2:33.5- 5 mph and 6.5 seconds faster than Chris Amon's time the year previous in a works Ferrari 312P and almost a second ahead of the #14 Jo Siffert/Brian Redman Gulf-Porsche 917K. Following them were the Porsche/Audi USA sponsored Porsche 917K driven by Vic Elford and Kurt Ahrens Jr., the #20 works Ferrari 512S Spyder of Jacky Ickx/Peter Schetty, the #15 Gulf-Porsche 917K of Pedro Rodríguez/Leo Kinnunen, and a NART-entered Ferrari 512S Spyder of Sam Posey/Ronnie Bucknum and the #21 works Ferrari 512S of Ignazio Giunti/Nino Vaccarella.

Race
The 1970 running is considered by many to be the best 12 Hours of Sebring ever. This was the first 12 Hours of Sebring where the cars used a rolling start, a procedure similar to the start which is used at the Indianapolis 500, and has been used at every Sebring 12 Hours to this day. Before 1970, the drivers did a traditional Le Mans start, but the events of the 1969 Le Mans race in which English driver John Woolfe was killed driving his Porsche 917 after a crash in which he did not have his seatbelts fastened led the governing body to ban Le Mans starts on grounds of safety.

A group of 5-liter entries led away; Andretti led from pole position, followed by Siffert, Elford, Ickx, Rodriguez and the rest of the field, which included works Matra and Alfa Romeo prototypes, running in the 3-liter class. There was an accident between two Lolas- Bob Brown in the #26 car would continue, but Mike De Udy in the other Lola would retire after just one lap.

Ickx then moved ahead of Elford into 3rd, behind Siffert and Andretti, the former setting a fastest lap of 2:32.77 in an effort to catch Andretti, and he did for 2 laps- but Andretti regained it then lost it again when he pitted for fuel and a driver change. Other teams stopped for fuel and driver changes, as Andretti switched out with Merzario and Siffert with Redman. The #19's stop dropped it down to 5th, and moments later, Redman brought in the #14 car with electrical trouble. It was a lengthy pitstop, and the car dropped down the order. The order now was the #15 Porsche 917K of Rodriguez/Kinnunen, #16 Porsche 917K of Elford/Ahrens Jr, and the 3 works Ferraris. Near the 3rd hour, Rodriguez brought the leading car into the pits with a puncture. Although they were able to change the punctured tire and send Rodriguez out again, it was 4 laps behind the leading #19 Ferrari. The #16 car crashed and was out of the race with irreparable suspension damage. The Porsche 917K's problems allowed all three works Ferraris to lead the field into the night. And running in 5th place was a Solar Productions/Gulf sponsored #48 Porsche 908/02 of movie star and racer Steve McQueen (whose leg was in a cast) and Peter Revson, who was battling with the #33 works Alfa Romeo T33/3 of Toine Hezemans/Masten Gregory.

When night fell, the #20 Ickx/Schetty Ferrari went out after 151 laps with a blown head gasket, and the #21 Giunti/Vaccarella car was in the pits being repaired. Although the #19 Andretti/Merzario was still leading, and the #14 Redman/Kinnunen car, which had suffered newly designed front hub failures previously which caused it to drop out of contention, was out after 211 laps due to accident damage (Kinnunen and Siffert had switched cars; Siffert was now driving with Rodriguez). Then, Andretti brought the leading car in with gearbox problems. Although Merzario took the car back out again in the lead, the second-placed #15 Rodriguez/Siffert Porsche 917K was coming back after being 12 laps down for a while they were able to make up most of this deficit after the #19 Ferrari was in the pits. The Solar Productions Porsche 908/02 was in 3rd and the #21 Giunti/Vaccarella car was in 4th. And at 9:46 p.m. The #19 Ferrari was out of the race, which put the Rodriguez/Siffert Porsche 917K in the lead and the McQueen/Revson car was in 2nd.

With 30 minutes remaining, one car still running and desperate for an overall victory, Ferrari team manager Mauro Forghieri decided to replace Giunti with the faster and more experienced Andretti in the #21 car. Although the #21 car was a lap behind; Andretti went out, and pushed very hard; unlapped himself and was making up time quickly on Siffert and Revson. But then all of a sudden, Siffert brought the #15 Gulf-Porsche 917K into the pits with front hub failure, the same problems which had stricken its sister car. This long pitstop allowed the Solar Productions Porsche 908/02 to take 1st- but Andretti had managed to pass Revson and take the lead back. But all of a sudden Andretti brought the car back into the pits for fuel- and the McQueen/Revson Porsche took the lead once again. But Andretti was not about to give up so easily – with only 1 lap to go he stormed out of the pits and chased down Revson, and at the end of the 5.2-mile lap Andretti crossed the line first, with Revson second (who managed to score a 3-liter class win), Masten Gregory in the #33 Alfa was third and the #15 Gulf-Porsche was fourth. Of the 68 cars that started the race, the brutal Sebring circuit managed to whittle the field down to 28 cars.

Official results

Statistics
Pole position: #19 SpA Ferrari SEFAC Ferrari 512S Spyder (Mario Andretti/Arturo Merzario)- 2:33.5 (121.970 mph/196.254 km/h)
Fastest lap: #14 John Wyer Automotive Engineering Porsche 917K (Jo Siffert)- 2:32.77 (122.497 mph/197.102 km/h)
Distance: 2075.410 km (1281.117 miles)
Average Speed: 172.667 km/h (106.584 mph)
Weather conditions: Sunny

References

12 Hours of Sebring
Sebring 12 Hours
Sebring
Sebring
Sebring